An equator is the intersection of a sphere's surface with the plane perpendicular to the sphere's axis of rotation and midway between the poles. On Earth, the Equator, at 0° latitude, divides the Northern and Southern Hemispheres.

Equator may also refer to:

Geography and astronomy
 Celestial equator
 Thermal equator
 Solar equator
 Chemical equator
 Equatorial bulge

Film and television
 Equator HD, a geography-themed television network that broadcasts in high-definition
 Equator (BBC TV series), a 2006 documentary series based on a journey along the equator
 The Equator Man, a 2012 South Korean television series

Literature and periodicals
 The Equator (newspaper), a 19th-century black issues newspaper
 Following the Equator, an 1897 social commentary and travelogue by Mark Twain

Music
 Equator Records, a Kenya-based record label active from 1960 to 1974
 Equator Records (Canada), a Canadian record label founded in 2006
Albums
 Equator (Randy Stonehill album), 1983
 Equator (Uriah Heep album), 1985
Songs
 "Equator", a song by Sparks from their 1974 album Kimono My House

Transportation

Air transportation
 Air Equator, a former airline based in Gan, Maldives

Automobiles
 Ford Equator, the name of three different vehicles:
 Ford Equator (2000 concept), a 2000 American mid-size pickup concept
 Ford Equator (2005 concept), a 2005 American compact SUV concept based on the Ford Escape
 Ford Equator, a 2021–present Chinese mid-size SUV produced by Jiangling Motors
 Suzuki Equator, a 2008–2012 American mid-size pickup truck

Watercraft
 Equator (schooner), an 1888 two-masted pygmy trading schooner
 , a Soviet cargo liner

Others
 Equator IRC, an Interdisciplinary Research Collaboration focused on experiences integrating physical and digital interactions
 EQUATOR (Enhancing the QUAlity and Transparency Of health Research), an international health research quality initiative
 Equator Principles, a business risk management framework
 Equator Prize, a UN award recognizing efforts to reduce poverty through conservation
 Equator crossing ceremony, a traditional naval initiation rite

See also
 Équateur (disambiguation)
 Province of Équateur, a province of the Democratic Republic of the Congo
 Équateur (former province), a former province of the Democratic Republic of the Congo
 Équateur District, a district of the Democratic Republic of the Congo
 Équateur (film), a 1983 French film
 Ecuador (disambiguation)